Collection (computing) may refer to:

 Collection (linking), the act of linkage editing in computing
 Collection (abstract data type), an abstract data type in computing

See also 
 Garbage collection (computing)